Grigory Olegovich Borisenko (born 15 April 2002) is a Russian football player who plays as a right winger for FC Baltika Kaliningrad.

Club career
He made his debut in the Russian Premier League for FC Lokomotiv Moscow on 20 November 2021 in a game against FC Akhmat Grozny. He made his European debut on 25 November 2021 in an Europa League game against Lazio.

Career statistics

References

External links
 
 
 
 

2002 births
Living people
Russian footballers
Russia youth international footballers
Association football midfielders
FC Lokomotiv Moscow players
FC Baltika Kaliningrad players
Russian Premier League players
Russian First League players
Russian Second League players